Sahakdukht was an Armenian hymnographer, poet and pedagogue who lived during the early 8th century. She is the first known woman of Armenian literature and music. Along with her slightly later contemporary Khosrovidukht, she is among the earliest woman composers in history. Sahakdukht and her brother , who became a noted composer and music theorist, were educated in Dvin. She then spent her life as an ascetic, living in a cave (a grotto) of the Garni valley where she wrote and taught music. Though she is said to have written much Christian music, particularly for the Virgin Mary, only a single šarakan survives, the acrostic "Srbuhi Mariam" ("Saint Mary"). The work shows considerable stylistic connections to contemporaneous Byzantine theotokions and kanons. Though her piece did not join the general šarakan liturgy, Sahakdukht's oeuvre as a whole is thought to have exerted considerable influence on subsequent šarakans; they introduced certain phrases into popular use and according to ethnomusicologist Şahan Arzruni they "helped to shape the development of the genre during subsequent centuries".

Life
Extremely little is known about the life of Sahakdukht, also spelled as Sahakdoukht, or Sahakduxt. The information available is chiefly from an account of 13th-century historian Stephen Orbelian. Active in the early 8th-century, her brother was the composer and music theorist , known for his šarakans (canonical hymns). Both Sahakdukht and her brother were educated at a cathedral school in the city of Dvin. She then spent her life as an ascetic, living in a cave (a grotto) of the Garni valley, near present-day Yerevan. There she produced ecclesiastical poems as well as liturgical chants. Sahakdukht is said to have taught music to children and amateur adults from Garni. Due to the conventions of her time, Sahakdukht gave such instruction while seated behind a curtain. In 1909, the Armenian poet and writer Sibil used Sahakdukht's role as a teacher to promote education for women, saying in a speech that:

Works

Sahakdukht is recognized as the first known woman composer and poet of Armenia, followed by her slightly-later contemporary Khosrovidukht. She purportedly wrote many now-lost Christian religious compositions, including ktsurds (antiphons and anthems), šarakans and other melodies. The poetry for such genres included both rhyme and fixed verse. Sources say that such works were often written for the Virgin Mary, making them roughly equivalent to the contemporaneous Byzantine tradition of theotokions. 

The only composition by Sahakdukht to survive is the šarakan "Srbuhi Mariam" ("Saint Mary"), an homage to Mary. It is a nine-stanza acrostic verse, where the first letter of each quatrain spells out 'Sahakdukht'. This piece is aligned stylistically with šarakans of the 'Metzatsustse' (Magnificat) type. In addition, "Srbuhi Mariam"—and presumably much of Sahakdukht's lost oeuvre—is modeled after the Byzantine kanon like the works of her brother. This may be explained by the fact that Stepanos lived in Constantinople for many years, where Germanus I, an important proponent of early kanons, was active. See  for an English translation of "Srbuhi Mariam". Some scholars, including Ghevont Alishan, Malachia Ormanian and Grigor Hakobian attribute Khosrovidukht's šarakan "Zarmanali e Ints" to Sahakdukht instead.

Like the sole surviving work of Khosrovidukht, Sahakdukht's šarakan has not garnered a position in the official collection šarakans. It is not found among the apocryphal šarakans either. Nevertheless, Sahakdukht's šarakans are thought to have had a considerable impact on subsequent generations; ethnomusicologist Şahan Arzruni notes that they "helped to shape the development of the genre during subsequent centuries". In addition, according to historian Agop Jack Hacikyan, phrases appearing in "Srbuhi Mariam" such as "incorruptible temple," "ray of divine light," and "tree of life" have since become standard and popular in Armenian religious poetry and music.

References

Notes

Citations

Sources

Further reading
   This article is essentially a reprint of 
 
 

8th-century women composers
8th-century women writers
8th-century poets
8th-century Armenian writers
8th-century Armenian women
8th-century educators
8th-century scientists
Armenian composers
Year of birth unknown
Women hymnwriters
Christian hymnwriters
Armenian women poets
Medieval Armenian woman writers
Christian ascetics
Music therapists
Folk healers